Jabez Thomas Sunderland (11 February 1842 – 13 August 1936) was a minister of the Unitarian church in the United States and an outspoken activist for human rights and anti-imperialism. He was especially involved in matters of Indian independence and wrote the book India in Bondage (1929, 1932).

He was born in Yorkshire in United Kingdom to Thomas and Sarah Broadhead. After the family moved to the United States of America, he was educated at the University of Chicago, receiving an AB in 1867 and a master's in 1869 followed by studies at the Baptist Union Theological seminary receiving a BD (1870). He received an honorary D.D. from Tufts University in 1914. He worked across North America and wrote numerous books. He was involved in movements to improve women's education, the conditions of work, world peace, and was an anti-imperialist who took a lot of interest in India. He was an advocate for self governance by Indians and made a trip to India in 1895-96 partly to meet the leaders of the Brahmo Samaj which had impressed him. He met with Dr Atmaram Pandurang and spoke at the Fergusson College in 1895. He met leaders of the Indian National Congress who were meeting in Poona for the tenth meeting. His book, India in Bondage (1929) was published shortly after Katherine Mayo's Mother India and included an appendix rebutting some of her claims. His wife, Eliza Read Sunderland, was a writer, educator, lecturer, and women's rights advocate.

References

External links 
 Dictionary of Unitarian and Universalist Biography
 India In Bondage (1929)

1842 births
1936 deaths
19th-century Unitarian clergy
20th-century Unitarian clergy
American human rights activists
People from Yorkshire
English emigrants to the United States
University of Chicago alumni